Corruption represents an increasing issue across Canada. On Transparency International's 2021 Corruption Perceptions Index, Canada scored 82 on a scale from 0 ("highly corrupt") to 100 ("highly clean"). This score continues a slow decline from Canada's 2012 score of 84. For comparison, the global average score in 2021 was 43. When ranked by score, Canada ranked number 13 among the 180 countries in the 2021 Index, where the country ranked number 1 is perceived to have the most honest public sector. Conflicts of interest within government, tax evasion, and the ease in which money can be laundered  are among some of the leading factors of corruption in Canada. 

Canada ranks at the bottom of the bribery-fighting rankings with "little or no enforcement of anti-bribery measures". The 2014 Ernst & Young global fraud survey found that "twenty percent of Canadian executives believe bribery and corruption are widespread in this country".

Low enforcement of anti-corruption laws is evident as seen in the recent case against SNC-Lavalin; a Canadian construction company which allegedly paid US$48 million in bribes to Libyan officials  and has resulted in the resignation of several members within Prime Minister Justin Trudeau's cabinet.

Corruption by region

Ontario 

The Ontario Liberal Party, under leader and Ontario Premier Kathleen Wynne, was involved in corruption cases that included bribery during elections. Prominent Liberal Party fundraiser Gerry Lougheed Jr. was charged by the Ontario Provincial Police (OPP). and was later acquitted. 

The Royal Canadian Mounted Police alleged that the Ontario Provincial Police Association union leaders committed fraud and are guilty of money laundering and corruption. These included President James (Jim) Christie, Vice-president Martin Bain and chief administrative officer Karl Walsh. The charges include "unusual investment of union money in condos in the Bahamas", "formation of a company to provide exclusive travel services for both union business and personal travel by members", "formation of a consulting company" that billed the union $5000 per month, and for "questionable vacation and travel expenses billed to the union".

Quebec 
The Charbonneau Commission was established in 2011 to investigate corruption in Quebec. It has uncovered long running, widespread corruption including "price-fixing schemes among construction companies bidding on municipal governments", "illegal donations to the province's major political parties from some of its biggest engineering firms" and links between the Fédération des travailleurs et travailleuses du Québec, the Quebec Federation of Labour (FTQ), the province's biggest federation of unions, and organized crime.

In 2015, employees of EBR Information Technology firm, IBM Canada and Revenu Québec were arrested for fraud, conspiracy and breach of trust in relation to computer equipment and services contracts to the provincial government. There are widespread "financial and management irregularities with the Quebec government's computer networks."

On January 26, 2017, former mayor of Montreal Michael Applebaum was found guilty of 8 corruption-related charges. Applebaum was found guilty in relation to cash kickbacks related to real estate development projects and a municipal contract for the management and maintenance of the NDG Sports Centre.

In March 2017, Andrew Potter, academic and former director of the McGill Institute for the Study of Canada, wrote an article critical of Quebec civil society. In arguing that Quebec suffered social malaise, he used evidence showing that the province has the largest underground economy in Canada and that many citizens regularly avoid paying taxes by illegal but widely common practices. A firestorm of criticism against Potter soon ensued, mostly focusing on the fact that he was a publicly paid academic at a provincial university and thus it was improper for him to have said these things, but the facts remained undisputed.

Corruption by sector

Health 
Dr. Shiv Chopra, a former employee of Health Canada and a whistle-blower, has criticized Health Canada for circumventing safety and efficacy regulations to please product manufacturers, for systematic collusion with corporations in "extra-parliamentary decisions involving the imposition of new risks on society" and for overlooking the responsibility to protect health and humans, in pursuit of capital-making profits". Dr. Michele Brill-Edwards previously issued similar warnings and expressed the same concerns earlier.

Some doctors and clinics have been found to overbill and/or double bill the Canadian Health System. Some walk-in clinics intake regular patients at a higher cost to the system without informing the patients about the cost or other options that might be available. In Canada, doctors do not disclose the costs of visits or procedures to the patients. That information can only be obtained through a freedom of information request. This lack of transparency contributes to the proliferation of this form of corruption.

Some dentists have been found guilty of overcharging insured patients by altering procedure codes, waive co-payment so that the patient pays nothing, or treat patients other than the insurance holder.

In Alberta, a medical inquiry established the existence of queue-jumping and illegal fast-tracking of private clinic referrals. Alberta's former head of Health Services, Stephen Duckett, noted that "preferential access to care was a common practice when he took over and politicians had fixers who could get valued constituents faster treatment."

Education 
Some private high schools have been found to illegally and unethically help students earn inflated grades, credits and credentials. Thus, those with financial means are able to access top university programs and scholarships at the expense of merit students. These schools are referred to as "credit mills" or "credit shops". Lax governmental oversight is a major cause of this corruption.

A report in 2007 said that the majority of students at Canadian universities are engaged in cheating. Among the cheaters, a disproportionately high number are international students. "Students who cheat are unlikely to be caught and face few penalties when they are."

Research and Scholarly Publishing 
Two of Canada's leading medical journal publishers Andrew John Publishing and Pulsus Group have been purchased by OMICS Publishing Group, which is considered a predatory and junk science publisher. OMICS is being sued by FTC. FTC has alleged that OMICS "misrepresented the legitimacy of its publications, deceived researchers, and obfuscated sizeable publication fee." Pulsus Group has been on Jeffrey Beall's list of "Potential, possible, or probable" predatory open-access publishers.

Tax 
Canada has a very high rate of tax evasion. Individuals and companies with high net worths use offshore tax havens to illegally avoid paying tax. Canadians have  sitting in the world's top ten tax-haven countries. Black market or under-the-table commercial activity also contributes to tax avoidance losses. Tax evasion and corruption are facilitated by lawyers, administrative corruption and inefficiency in the Canada Revenue Agency, Canadian and foreign banks.

Canada's lax regulations make it one of the top countries for anonymous shell companies, which are often used for tax evasion, money laundering, terrorist financing and organized crime. Canadians for Tax Fairness calculate that legal tax avoidance by corporations alone costs the Canadian treasury almost $8 billion Canadian a year. When they calculated the 2015 numbers, they found that corporations and individuals combined sent  of declared assets to tax havens, and the ten most popular alone now held  Canadian in assets.

Highly reputed multinational accounting firm KPMG has been accused by the Canada Revenue Agency of offering tax evasion schemes as products to its clients. It alleged that the KPMG tax structures were in reality a "sham" intended to deceive the tax authorities. KPMG offered a "no tax" scheme in return for a fee of 15% and in one case before the courts, it earned $300,000 in fees.

Law Enforcement 

The RCMP's own study found 330 internal corruption cases between 1995 and 2005. "Improperly giving out police information was the most common type of corrupt behaviour, followed by fraud, misuse of police officer status, theft and interference with the judicial process." These numbers are likely an understatement of true levels as the RCMP has admitted not tracking "hundreds of cases of serious misconduct committed by Mounties across the country for years". Also, in 2013 nearly 300 current and former female Mounties joined a class-action lawsuit alleging harassment.

CBSA which was formed out of the merger of the 3 legacy border protection agencies, in 2004, including, Immigration Canada, Canadian Food Inspection Agency, and Canada Customs and currently has no oversight body.It is widely believed there is a considerable amount of questionable activity has gone largely unnoticed, unreported or suppressed according to complaints from former and current Border Service Officers, (BSO's). Most of the few cases, have been in the media only briefly, and had little to no follow up. The CBSA, normally distances itself from liability by blaming "rogue employees", other departments and outside contractors. The complaint process is nearly impossible to navigate for both the public and employees. Many of those employees who have spoken out, have stated they were in fear of reprisals. Despite legislation known as ATIP, or Access to Information Policy, acquiring statistics, or reports is also a complex process, that can take months despite the standard 60-day law to comply and appeals to the Public Service Integrity Commission are often "Well Founded." Early retirements are a common remedy for offences involving management.

As noted above, Ontario Provincial Police Association leadership has allegedly committed fraud, money laundering and corruption. The matter was brought before a jury in the Ontario Superior Court where all parties were acquitted of the allegations. (thestar.com) ref provided

In 2016, Toronto Police Service faced several high-profile cases of corruption and disproportionate use of force. Constable James Forcillo was found guilty of attempt of murder in the death of 18-year-old Sammy Yatim. Four police officers were arrested and charged with "nine counts of obstructing justice and eight counts of perjury".

Non-profit sector 
In Canada, donations to recognized charities receive tax refunds. This system has been abused extensively. "Typically, tax-shelter firms hook up with a little-known charity that becomes a sort of tax receipt mill, suddenly writing millions of dollars in bogus receipts and making grandiose claims of saving the world. Some $3.2 billion in receipts given in the last few years to 100,000 Canadians have either been disallowed or soon will be".

Many charities have been found to be shell organizations for profit-based schemes. A Toronto Star investigation revealed that "self-reported information is so riddled with inaccuracies as to be absolutely useless to a donor" and that the federal government does not verify the claims of charities' "good works". Furthermore, "The Star found the primary regulator, the federal Charities Directorate, is virtually powerless to deal with problem charities."

Several Canadian charities have been found to be front organizations for terrorist organizations or organized crime.

Insurance 
Auto insurance fraud involving scammers, auto repair shops, paralegals and medical clinics is widespread in Ontario. It is estimated that the auto insurance fraud costs Ontario drivers $1.3 billion per year. Other forms of insurance fraud are also relatively common, including that related to homes and property, and disability and workers' compensation which anecdotal evidence, at least, suggests is rife with abuse and fraud.

Investigation into insurance scams in Peel Region revealed that police officers colluded with the tow truck drivers and fraudsters in staging accidents. "Fraudulent accident reports" were provided by a veteran officer. Other officers were involved in tipping off the tow trucks of the accident locations.

Drivers licensing 
Canadian provinces mandate written and road tests (graduated licensing) to obtain licence to drive automobiles. Truck drivers must undergo specialized training and obtain a commercial licence. Some provinces, such as Ontario, have privatized drivers licensing, while others offer it as a public service. There exists corruption at various levels of drivers licensing.

A dangerous corruption is when non-qualified people obtain fake drivers licences by bribing licensing officers, which are then used for various illegal purposes such as to obtain credit, make insurance claims etc. Issuing of fake in-class driving lesson certificates is another scam related to obtaining licensing. In-class driver lesson certificates are used to get discount rates from insurance companies.

A Toronto Star investigation found that "the truck-driver testing centre is letting learners earn their licences without being required to drive on a major expressway". Furthermore, many driving schools offer in-vehicle "lessons even though they are not authorized  by the province to do so".

Real estate 
Fraud and corruption is committed by all parties at all levels in the real estate sector. Buyers, sellers, realtors, developers, lawyers, mortgage brokers and banks have been implicated in various fraud and corruption cases. Money laundering, lying about income and occupation, fake bids, value falsification, title fraud and falsely claiming as owner-occupied are common real estate frauds in Canada.

Money laundering is likely in the real estate sector of major Canadian cities. Chinese buyers are suspected of laundering money through the Vancouver real estate market in large numbers, with the help of major Canadian banks. According to a The Globe and Mail investigation, "some Canadian banks allow wealthy Asian investors to skirt Chinese law by helping them bring in large amounts of money, which is then often used to buy real estate in Vancouver." A report by the Financial Transactions and Reports Analysis Centre of Canada indicates "dramatic under-reporting of large cash transactions and suspicious transactions" in the Vancouver real estate sector.

In 2012, Equifax uncovered $400 million of mortgage fraud in Canada, which experts suspect represents only a fraction of the cheating taking place in the country's real estate market.

The Panama Papers leak of documents from the law offices of Mossack Fonseca brought to light a rather high level of referrals by Canadian banks to the Panamanian offshore specialist. The Royal Bank of Canada (RBC) sent 370+ clients to Mossack Fonseca over the years, for example, but they underlined that the bank did not help its customers to avoid taxes or hide income. "We have an extensive due diligence process... RBC works within the legal and regulatory framework of every country in which we operate," said a bank spokesman. RBC CEO David McKay said the bank will review the documentation for those four decades in order to address any problems. CEO Bill Downe of the Bank of Montreal said "Canadian banks have 'dramatically' beefed up anti-money-laundering control over the last seven to 10 years," He added that any link between Canadian businesses and the Panama Papers offshore companies must have originated a long time ago, before Canadian banks took action to stop money laundering.

Government and civil service

Employment insurance overcharges

In the late 1990s and 2000s, the Government of Canada illegally overcharged Canadians with respect to employment insurance premiums. The overcharges exceeded $40 billion. As noted by the Auditor General of Canada in her 2004 report:
Parliament did not intend, in my view, that the Account would accumulate a surplus beyond what could reasonably be spent for employment insurance purposes, given the existing benefit structure, while also providing for an economic downturn. Accordingly, in my opinion, the Government did not observe the intent of the Employment Insurance Act.

On December 11, 2008, the Supreme Court of Canada ruled the overcharges were unlawful. As stated by the Supreme Court of Canada in Confédération des syndicats nationaux v. Canada (Attorney General):

[96] For these reasons, I would therefore allow the appeals in part and declare that the versions of ss. 66.1  and 66.3  of the Employment Insurance Act that applied in 2002, 2003 and 2005 are invalid and that employers' and employees' premiums for 2002, 2003 and 2005 were collected unlawfully.

Notable corruption cases 
 Pacific Scandal 1871-1874
 Sponsorship scandal 1996-2004
 Tunagate 1985
 Temporary foreign worker program in Canada widespread abuse and violations
 Ontario power plant scandal
 Ornge scandal

Airbus affair

Family Compact

Padma Bridge alleged graft

Panama Papers 
No Canadian politicians' names from the national government have surfaced in the Panama Papers as of the end of May 2016. The Globe and Mail did ask Prime Minister Justin Trudeau, whose name did not appear in either of the document releases, about this, for the record. He told reporters that he does not have any money in offshore accounts, and had "entirely and completely been transparent about mine and my family's finances. That is something I learned early on that Canadians expect from their leaders."

Some names of Canadian individuals did appear in the leaked documents, according to ICIJ investigation partner the Toronto Star.

John Mark Wright, a mutual fund broker, had three shell companies in the British Virgin Islands for handling profits from a mine in the Democratic Republic of Congo.
Eric Van Nguyen, a Montreal resident with registered companies in Samoa and another in the British Virgin Islands, also faces fraud charges in New York in a penny stock scheme.
Brian Shamess, a sports physician from Sault Ste Marie, used a Mossack Fonseca company to buy a condo on Panama Bay in 2011.
Eric Marc Levine, who operates fitness clubs in Asia and has registered at least 15 companies in the BVI through Mossack Fonseca. The Thai Anti-Money Laundering Office froze some of his business assets following fraud allegations; Levine responded with a defamation suit.
Former Newfoundland Cabinet minister Chuck Furey incorporated in Panama to buy a condo in 2008. He no longer has overseas holdings, he said.

Canadians for Tax Fairness has calculated that legal tax avoidance by corporations alone cost the Canadian treasury almost $8 billion (Canadian) a year. When it calculated the 2015 numbers, the group found that corporations and individuals combined sent CAN$40 billion of declared assets to tax havens, and the ten most popular tax havens alone now held $270 billion (Canadian) in assets.

Paradise Papers 
More than 3,000 Canadian names, including three former prime ministers, current Liberal party operatives, a hockey team, trusts, foundations and individuals are identified in the Paradise Papers relating to offshore accounts. The documents link Stephen Bronfman, the chief liberal party fund-raiser and close aide to prime minister Justin Trudeau to tax avoidance schemes. Tax expert Marwah Rizqy has noted that if these documents are proven accurate, they contain the "smoking gun" linking Stephen Bronfman to illegal tax sheltering/avoidance.

Sino-Forest alleged fraud

Somalia affair

Anti-corruption mechanisms

Public Service Commission 
Canada's public service is set up to work independently from the political party in power. The mandate of the Public Service Commission is to protect the public service from political interference and "ensure professional, non-partisan public service". The Office of Public Service Values and Ethics is tasked with implementing values, ethics and policies to prevent corruption.

The Conservative government of Stephen Harper has been criticized for political interference in an array of administrative bodies including Statistics Canada, Elections Canada, the Canadian Military Complaints Commission, the Canadian Nuclear Safety Commission, Public Works and the Supreme Court.

Auditor General, Ombudsman 
Canada's federal and provincial governments have independent and strong Auditor General offices. The Auditor-General reports to the Parliament, not to the cabinet, and conducts annual and special audits to examine the government's activities and hold it to account. Auditor-General reports have brought to light major scandals, corruption, waste and inefficiencies, and led to changes in governments.

Ombudsman offices are tasked with investigating public complaints about government. Special ombudsmans or commissioners are tasked with investigating and reporting to Parliament about key areas. The Privacy Commissioner of Canada, Environment and Sustainable Development Commissioner and Information Commissioner of Canada are examples of these special offices.

Civilian oversight bodies 
Civilian oversight bodies are used to hold organizations accountable, to assess the power of and provide input for governmental and industrial bodies. They are specially used to hold the police, the RCMP, the military and the CSIS accountable.

In 2012, Office of the Inspector General, which was a key oversight body for the Canada's spy agency CSIS was abolished by the Conservative government. The government said the oversight functions were consolidated within the civilian Security Intelligence Review Committee.

Access to Information Act 
Canada's Access to Information Act came into force in 1983. However, in recent years the legislation has been severely criticized to be outdated and ineffective. The Centre for Law and Democracy ranks Canada 56th out of 95 countries in terms of the strength of the Access to Information legislation. Both Federal and various Provincial and Territorial government's access to information systems are overburdened, in part, by the refusal of many governments and agencies to informally release various data either as a matter of routine course or upon informal request, instead demanding that written requests be made pursuant to relevant access to information legislation, subsequently triggering a cumbersome and time-consuming formal process for frequently trivial and even obviously public information. As of 2015, there are thousands of individuals employed full-time throughout all levels of government and their agencies tasked with processing formal requests for access to information; this represents a cost to the Canadian taxpayer of hundreds of millions of dollars annually and does not include additional expenses including outside legal and other professional opinions, tribunal hearings, motions and appeals in courts, multiple access to information commissions and tribunals across the country, and various other expenses that likely bring the annual cost to the taxpayer into the billions of dollars.

An investigation by the Information Commissioner of Canada has found that the Conservative government's staff had systematically interfered with the processing of access to information requests.

Conflict of Interest laws 
All levels of governments enforce conflict of interest laws for civil servants and politicians. The laws generally require disclosure of actual or perceived conflict of interests and appropriate measures, such as recusal from decisions.

Conflict of interest laws have been used to highlight an array of improper dealings by politicians. For instance, in 2015 an Ethics Commissioner report found "Government Services Minister Diane Finley breached conflict-of-interest rules by giving preferential treatment and federal funding to a project" that received "one of its lowest ratings" in an assessment done by the Department of Human Resources and Skills Development. The project proposal was submitted by the Canadian Federation of Chabad Lubavitch by Ottawa rabbi Chaim Mendelsohn, who had close ties to the Conservative party, the Prime Minister's Office and then-foreign affairs minister John Baird."

Federal Accountability Act 
The Federal Accountability Act is a major anti-corruption legislation passed in 2006 by the Harper Conservative government.  It introduced several mechanisms to combat corruption including Commissioner of Lobbying, Parliamentary Budget Officer, Public Sector Integrity Commissioner, Ethics Commissioner, limits to election donations and enhancement of lobbying rules.

Public Servants Disclosure Protection Act 
The Public Servants Disclosure Protection Act is a whistleblower protection act. The Act "provides a confidential process for employees in Canada's federal public sector to come forward with any information about possible wrongdoing within the federal government and state corporations", except the Canadian Security Intelligence Service (CSIS), the Communications Security Establishment Canada (CSEC) and the Canadian Forces.

Corruption of Foreign Public Officials Act 
Canada signed and agreed to implement the OECD Anti-Bribery Convention and the OECD Convention on Combating Bribery of Foreign Public Officials in International Business Transactions. The Corruption of Foreign Public Officials Act (CFPOA) was enacted in 1999. The CFPOA applies to persons and companies, aiming to prevent and punish the acts of bribery of foreign public officials to obtain or retain a business advantage. Companies have to develop effective compliance programs with focus on specific areas relevant for the CFPOA.

The aim of the law is to monitor, punish and prevent bribery and other criminal acts being committed by Canadians and Canadian companies in foreign countries. In 2014, Ottawa consultant Nazir Karigar was the first person to be convicted under this law. He was convicted for the Air India bribery scheme.

A 2013 progress report indicates that Canada has failed to implement many of the recommendations and earns an overall score of "Moderate". OECD criticized Canada for lack of prosecutions and lack of resource allocation to address corruption.

Open data, open government, and transparency initiatives 
Canadian governments at all levels and citizen organizations have undertaken various Open data, Open government and transparency initiatives. A major accountability project "GovernmentExpenses.Ca" was made public in 2010 which Maclean's magazine said is one of the "most important (and, in a way, exciting) contributions to the political process". The Open Government Strategy was launched by the federal government in March 2011. Various datasets have been released under municipal open data initiatives such as Toronto Open Data. Sharing of MP/MPP/Councilor expenses online, sunshine lists, posting detail program budgets and expenditures online and crime statistics are some examples of open data being released online. Open data has increased public scrutiny of abuses, helping monitor, prosecute and prevent corruption.

International conventions and transparency initiatives 
Canada has ratified United Nations Convention against Corruption and the OECD Anti-Bribery Convention.

The government of Canada is part of the multilateral Open Government Partnership initiative. Canada joined the International Aid Transparency Initiative (IATI) in 2011. Canada was a supporting country to the Extractive Industries Transparency Initiative, and it intends to implement the EITI.

First Nations Financial Transparency Act 
The First Nations Financial Transparency Act was created in 2013 by the Harper Conservative government, with the purpose of increasing financial transparency in First Nations Communities. The First Nations Financial Transparency Act requires First Nation bands to publicly disclose their financial statements, including salary information of their councillors. Disclosure of this information has highlighted relatively high salaries of many chiefs, in comparison to extreme poor living conditions of their members. For instance, Shuswap band has 87 on-reserve members. Take into account that this is only a few dollars per day when the total amount is divided by the number of tribes-people. Its Chief Paul Sam, the man highest on the totem pole, earned $202,413 in tax-free salary while many band members endured winters without water or electricity. The First Nations Financial Transparency Act has promoted higher vigilance regarding band leadership's activities and financial management by members and fellow councilors.

On December 18, 2015, Minister of Indigenous and Northern Affairs Carolyn Bennett announced that the Liberal government will stop enforcing the Act, and will "suspend any court actions against First Nations who have not complied with the Act", releasing funds withheld from First Nations communities that have not complied with the Act.

Integrity Regime 
Government of Canada's Integrity Regime prohibits the federal government from doing business with any company if "they, or members of their board of directors have been convicted or absolutely/conditionally discharged in the last three years" of corruption or malpractice offences including income and excise tax evasion, secret commissions and bribing a foreign public official.

See also 
 Crime in Canada
 Corruption by country
 Corruption in the United States
 International Anti-Corruption Academy
 Group of States Against Corruption
 International Anti-Corruption Day
 ISO 37001 Anti-bribery management systems
 United Nations Convention against Corruption
 OECD Anti-Bribery Convention
 Transparency International

References

External links

 
Canada
Canada